Sanjog may refer to:

Sanjog (1943 film), a Bollywood film
Sanjog (1961 film), a Bollywood film starring Pradeep Kumar and Anita Guha
Sanjog (1971 film), a Bollywood film starring Amitabh Bachchan and Mala Sinha
Sanjog (1985 film), a Bollywood film starring Jeetendra and Jaya Prada
Sanjog Se Bani Sangini, 2010 Indian television series starring Mohammad Iqbal Khan and Binny Sharma
Sanjog (TV series). 2022 Indian television series starring Rajneesh Duggal and Shefali Sharma
Sanjog (name)